Snežana Babić (born 1 October 1967), better known as Sneki, is a Serbian singer. Born in Pančevo, she made her recording debut in 1988. Sneki had a memorable performance of the song "Moje vruće haljine" in the fourth instalment of the movie Tesna Koža (1991) alongside actor Milan Gutović in the lead role. She has to date released thirteen studio albums. In 2020, Babić was honored with the Life Achievement Award from the Union of the Musical Artists of Serbia (SEMUS).

Additionally, in 2013, Sneki participated in the first season of the reality competition show Tvoje lice zvuči poznato. 

Discography
Studio albums
 Neka stari ko voleti ne zna (1988)
 Il ne da đavo il ne da bog (1989)
 Pijmo (1990)
 Hopa cupa (1991)
 Ljubav je naša božja volja (1992)
 Ne traži me kad ti loše ide (1993)
 Igračka (1994)
 Sve mi ravno do Kosova (1995)
 Čaša greha (1997)
 Caki Cale (1998)
 Majko (1999)
 Hajmo Jovo na novo (2001)
 Par sati'' (2005)

Filmography

References

External links
 
 

1967 births
Living people
People from Pančevo
Serbian folk singers
Serbian folk-pop singers
Serbian turbo-folk singers
20th-century Serbian women singers
20th-century Serbian actresses
Grand Production artists
Serbian film actresses